Toros Peak is the rocky twin summit peak rising to 2961 m in Zinsmeister Ridge on the northeast side of Vinson Massif in Sentinel Range, Ellsworth Mountains in Antarctica, and surmounting Dater Glacier to the east and its tributary Hinkley Glacier to the northwest.

The peak is named after the settlement of Toros in Northern Bulgaria.

Location
US mapping in 1961, updated in 1988.

Maps
 Vinson Massif.  Scale 1:250 000 topographic map.  Reston, Virginia: US Geological Survey, 1988.
 D. Gildea and C. Rada.  Vinson Massif and the Sentinel Range.  Scale 1:50 000 topographic map.  Omega Foundation, 2007.
 Antarctic Digital Database (ADD). Scale 1:250000 topographic map of Antarctica. Scientific Committee on Antarctic Research (SCAR). Since 1993, regularly updated.

Notes

References
 Toros Peak. SCAR Composite Antarctic Gazetteer.
 Bulgarian Antarctic Gazetteer. Antarctic Place-names Commission. (details in Bulgarian, basic data in English)

External links
 Toros Peak. Copernix satellite image

Ellsworth Mountains
Mountains of Ellsworth Land
Bulgaria and the Antarctic